Dobryanka is a rural locality (a selo) in Ozyornensky Selsoviet of Seryshevsky District, Amur Oblast, Russia. The population was 181 as of 2018. There are 4 streets.

Geography 
Dobryanka is located 20 km north of Seryshevo (the district's administrative centre) by road. Belonogovo is the nearest rural locality.

References 

Rural localities in Seryshevsky District